Bohorodychne is a village in Kramatorsk Raion (district) in Donetsk Oblast of south-eastern Ukraine, at about  north-northwest from the centre of Donetsk city, on the right bank of the Siverskyi Donets river.

The village came under attack by Russian forces in June 2022, during the Russian invasion of Ukraine. On 17 August the Russian forces captured the village.

On 11 July the Interior Minister of the Luhansk People's Republic Vitaly Kiselyov claimed that Bohorodychne was captured by the LPR and Russia, although this claim was not independently verified.

On September the AFP reported that the village's population had been reduced to just two remaining residents.  Additionally, photographs in the article show that the church shown in the village's profile pic has been completely destroyed (see article cover picture).

References

Villages in Kramatorsk Raion
Izyumsky Uyezd